Sara McLaughlin Mitchell (born June 28, 1969) is an American political scientist and the  F. Wendell Miller Professor of Political Science at University of Iowa. She is known for her expertise on international relations and political methodology.

Education 
Mitchell received her B.S. in economics and political science from Iowa State University in 1991 and her Ph.D in political science from Michigan State University in 1997.   Her areas of expertise include international conflict, political methodology, and gender issues in academia. She is co-founder of the Journeys in World Politics workshop, a mentoring workshop for junior women studying international relations.

Books
 Domestic Law Goes Global: Legal Traditions and International Courts (with Emilia Justyna Powell), Cambridge University Press 2011
 Guide to the Scientific Study of International Processes (Wiley-Blackwell 2012)
 The Triumph of Democracy and the Eclipse of the West (Palgrave Macmillan 2013)
 Conflict, War, and Peace: An Introduction to Scientific Research (CQ Press/Sage 2013)
 What Do We Know About Civil Wars? (Rowman Littlfield 2016)

References

External links
Sara McLaughlin Mitchell at University of Iowa
Sara Mitchell research website

University of Iowa faculty
American international relations scholars
Michigan State University alumni
Living people
American women political scientists
American political scientists
Iowa State University alumni
1969 births
American women academics
21st-century American women